The 1998/99 FIS Nordic Combined World Cup was the 16th world cup season, a combination of ski jumping and cross-country skiing organized by FIS. It started on 21 Nov 1998 in Rovaniemi, Finland and ended on 21 March 1999 in Zakopane, Poland.

Calendar

Men

Standings

Overall 

Standings after 17 events.

Nations Cup 

Standings after 17 events.

References

External links
FIS Nordic Combined World Cup 1998/99 

1998 in Nordic combined
1999 in Nordic combined
FIS Nordic Combined World Cup